was the pseudonym of a Japanese painter in the nihonga school, active from Meiji through Shōwa period Japan. His real name was Kawai Yoshisaburō.

Biography 
Gyokudō was born in what is now Ichinomiya city, Aichi Prefecture, as the eldest son of a paper, ink and brush merchant. 
In the spring of 1887, he graduated from Gifu Jinji Kogakko Elementary School, and in September, with a letter of introduction from Aoki Senbashi, entered the school of Mochizuki Gyokusen in Kyoto, where he was given the name "Gyokusyu".
He went to Kyoto in 1887 to study under Kōno Bairei of the Maruyama-Shijo school of painting.  
In 1890, when he exhibited his work at the Industrial Exposition, he changed his name to "Gyokudo" after Gyokusen's name Tama and his grandfather's name Chikudo.
In 1896, he moved to Tokyo and he became the student of Hashimoto Gahō, of the Kanō school. He also studied Western-style painting and developed a highly personal style, especially in the field of landscape painting.

Gyokudō is noted for his polychrome and occasionally monochrome works depicting the mountains and rivers of Japan in the four seasons, with humans and animals shown as part of the natural landscape. Among his representative works are Futsuka zuki (“The New Moon”), Yuku haru (“The Departing Spring”), Mine-no-yu (“Evening at the Mountain Top”), and Bosetsu (“Snow in the Evening”).

In 1898, Gyokudō joined with Okakura Tenshin and Yokoyama Taikan to found the Nihon Bijutsuin (Japan Fine Art Academy). In 1907, Gyokudo was selected as a judge for the first annual Bunten Exhibition. He became a teacher at the Tokyo Bijutsu Gakkō (the forerunner of the Tokyo National University of Fine Arts and Music) in 1919.

Received the region of Honor from the French government in 1931 and the Grand Officer Coulonne from the Emperor of Italy in June.

In October 1933, he was awarded the First Class Honorary Medal of the Red Cross by the German government.

In June 1935, he was appointed a member of the Imperial Academy of Fine Arts. Awarded the Order of the Sacred Treasure, 3rd class, in November 1935.

In 1952, Kenso-dong organized a three person exhibition of Gyokudo, Taikan and Ryuko.

In 1957, Gyokudo developed heart asthma disease and recuperated, but the disease worsened again in early June and Gyokudo died on the 30th.

In 1940, he was awarded the Order of Culture by the Government of Japan.

Most of his works are preserved and displayed at the Gyokudo Art Museum, in Ōme, Tokyo.

Major works
Cormorant Fishing, Color on Silk, Meiji Period, 1895, 
Ducks, Color on Silk, Meiji Period, 1897, Tokyo National Museum
A Night Heron in Summer Rain, Color on Silk, Meiji Period, 1899, 
Hills and Streams in Autumn, Color on Silk, Meiji Period, 1906, Yamatane Museum of Art
Red and White Plum Blossoms, Color on Gold-Leafed Paper, Taishō Period, 1919, Gyokudō Art Museum
Lingering Snow, Color on Silk, Shōwa Period, 1934, The Japan Art Academy
Autumn Rain, Color on Silk, Shōwa Period, 1940, National Museum of Modern Art, Tokyo
After a Mountain Shower, Color on Silk, Shōwa Period, 1943, Yamatane Museum of Art
Young Ladies Planting Rice, Color on Silk, Shōwa Period, 1945, Yamatane Museum of Art
A Lady Arranging Flowers, Color on Paper, Shōwa Period, 1929, Gyokudō Art Museum
A Pair of Cranes on a Pine, Color on Silk, Shōwa Period, 1942, Yamatane Museum of Art
Bear, Color on Paper, Shōwa Period, 1946, Gyokudō Art Museum

References

 Briessen, Fritz van. The Way of the Brush: Painting Techniques of China and Japan. Tuttle (1999). 
 Conant, Ellen P., Rimer, J. Thomas, Owyoung, Stephen. Nihonga: Transcending the Past: Japanese-Style Painting, 1868-1968. Weatherhill (1996). 
 Kimura, Ihee. Four Japanese painters: Taikan Yokoyama, Gyokudo Kawai, Shoen Uemura, Kiyokata Kaburaki (JPS picture books). Japan Photo Service (1939). ASIN: B000888WYA
https://www.tobunken.go.jp/materials/bukko/8857.html

External links

brief bio and works
Rain at Yamagata Art Museum
Home page to Gyokudo Art Museum (Japanese)
bio and work at Adachi Museum of Art

1873 births
1957 deaths
Nihonga painters
Recipients of the Legion of Honour
People from Ichinomiya, Aichi
20th-century Japanese painters
Imperial household artists